Bernard Molyneux (born 17 September 1933) is an English footballer, who played as a full back in the Football League for Tranmere Rovers.

References

Tranmere Rovers F.C. players
Everton F.C. players
Runcorn F.C. Halton players
Association football fullbacks
English Football League players
1933 births
Living people
English footballers